Andriolata, is a settlement in the island of Kefalonia, Greece. It is part of the local community of Xenopoulo and the municipal unit of Eleios-Pronnoi. In 2011 its population was 8. It is situated 1.5 km north of Xenopoulo, 4 km west of Poros and 21 km east of Argostoli. It was part of the independent community of Xenopoulo between 1912 and 1997, when it became part of the municipality Eleios-Pronnoi.

Population

See also

List of settlements in Cephalonia

References

External links
Andriolata at the GTP Travel Pages

Eleios-Pronnoi
Populated places in Cephalonia